Nata Airport  is an airport serving the village of Nata in the Central District of Botswana.

See also

Transport in Botswana
List of airports in Botswana

References

External links
OpenStreetMap - Nata
OurAirports - Nata
Fallingrain - Nata Airport

Airports in Botswana